Helicopter Canada (aka Hélicoptère Canada) is a 1966 Canadian documentary film  produced by the National Film Board of Canada and directed by Eugene Boyko. The film features aerial photography of all ten of Canada's provinces. Helicopter Canada, sponsored by the Canada's Centennial Commission, was produced for international distribution in both French and English language versions for Canada's 100th anniversary.

Synopsis 
The short documentary offers a narrated tour from a helicopter of the Canadian provinces in 1966. The bird's-eye view showed both familiar and little-known aspects of the Canadian landscape. Among the featured film locations are: the Badlands, Alberta; Oak Island, Nova Scotia; Ottawa; Montréal; Québec City; Niagara Falls; Thousand Islands of the Saint Lawrence River; Toronto; Vancouver and Winnipeg.

Cast
 The Beatles (cameo)
 Lester B. Pearson

Production
Filmed in Panavision, Helicopter Canada took 18 months to produce and required cinematographer Eugene Boyko to spend 540 hours aloft in a specially outfitted Alouette II helicopter.

Helicopter Canada was made for international distribution during the Canadian centennial. Columbia Pictures bought the rights for a 22-minute version that was distributed internationally, including the USSR, USA, China and Italy. Besides French, the film was translated into 12 languages.

Reception
Although now considered dated, Helicopter Canada, during its initial release, received positive reviews. Joan Fox wrote in The Globe and Mail, "If this film doesn’t stir your Canadian blood, nothing will."

Awards
 19th Canadian Film Awards, Toronto: Best Film, General Information, 1967
 19th Canadian Film Awards, Toronto: Special Prize: “For providing a superbly appropriate and inspiring opportunity for Canadians to view their country in the Centennial Year”, 1967
 Canadian Travel Film Awards, Toronto: First Prize, 1967
 International Travel Documentary Film Festival, New Delhi: Special Prize, 1967
Adelaide International Film Festival, Adelaide: Diploma, 1969
 39th Academy Awards, Los Angeles: Nominee: Best Documentary Feature, 1967

References

Notes

Bibliography

 Wise, Wyndham. "Helicopter Canada." Take One's Essential Guide to Canadian Film. Toronto: University of Toronto Press, 2001. .

External links
 
 Watch Helicopter Canada at NFB Web site

1966 films
1966 documentary films
Canadian aviation films
Canadian documentary films
Canadian Centennial
Aerial photography
Documentary films about aviation
Documentary films about Canada
English-language Canadian films
Films shot in Canada
Canadian Screen Award-winning films
National Film Board of Canada documentaries
Travelogues
Films produced by Tom Daly
1960s English-language films
1960s Canadian films